Peter Fischer (born June 21, 1958) is an American politician serving in the Minnesota House of Representatives since 2013. A member of the Minnesota Democratic–Farmer–Labor Party (DFL), Fisher represents District 44A in the central Twin Cities metropolitan area, which includes the cites of Maplewood, Little Canada and North St. Paul and parts of Ramsey County, Minnesota.

Early life and education
Fischer was raised in Maplewood, Minnesota. He attended Lakewood Community College, graduating with an A.A., and later the University of St. Thomas, graduating with a B.A. in business administration. Prior to his election to the State House, Fischer served in the Maplewood government on the Parks Commission and the Human Relations Commission. Peter Fischer also works in the finance division of Face to Face, a non-profit organization serving housing insecure youth in St. Paul, MN.

Minnesota House of Representatives
Fischer was first elected to the Minnesota House of Representatives in 2012 and has been reelected every two years since.

During the 2019-20 legislative session, Fischer served as chair of the Water Division. From 2021-22, He was chair of the Behavioral Health Division. Fischer is currently chair of the Human Services Policy Committee and also sits on the Human Services Finance, Health Finance and Policy, and the Environment and Natural Resources Finance and Policy Committees.

Electoral history

Personal life
Peter Fischer is married to his wife, Kristi. They have two daughters and a son. They reside in Maplewood, Minnesota.

References

External links

Rep. Peter Fischer official Minnesota House of Representatives website
Rep. Peter Fischer official campaign website

1958 births
Living people
Democratic Party members of the Minnesota House of Representatives
People from Maplewood, Minnesota
University of St. Thomas (Minnesota) alumni
21st-century American politicians